Boyd Ridge is an ice-covered ridge,  long, which extends in an east–west direction and forms the south end of the Crary Mountains in Marie Byrd Land. It is separated from the main peaks of the group by Campbell Valley. It was mapped by the United States Geological Survey from ground surveys and from U.S. Navy air photos, 1959–66, and named by the Advisory Committee on Antarctic Names for John C. Boyd, a United States Antarctic Research Program biologist at McMurdo Station, 1965–66 and 1966–67 seasons.

See also
Runyon Rock

References 

Ridges of Marie Byrd Land
Volcanoes of Marie Byrd Land
Crary Mountains